To help compare different orders of magnitude, the following lists describe various mass levels between 10−59 kg and 1052 kg.  The least massive thing listed here is a graviton, and the most massive thing is the observable universe.  Typically, an object having greater mass will also have greater weight (see mass versus weight), especially if the objects are subject to the same  gravitational field strength.

Units of mass

The table at right is based on the kilogram (kg), the base unit of mass in the International System of Units (SI). The kilogram is the only standard unit to include an SI prefix (kilo-) as part of its name. The gram (10−3 kg) is an SI derived unit of mass. However, the names of all SI mass units are based on gram, rather than on kilogram; thus 103 kg is a megagram (106 g), not a *kilokilogram.

The tonne (t) is an SI-compatible unit of mass equal to a megagram (Mg), or 103 kg. The unit is in common use for masses above about 103 kg and is often used with SI prefixes. For example, a gigagram (Gg) or 109 g is 103 tonnes, commonly called a kilotonne.

Other units
Other units of mass are also in use.  Historical units include the stone, the  pound, the carat, and the grain.

For subatomic particles, physicists use the mass equivalent to the energy represented by an electronvolt (eV). At the atomic level, chemists use the mass of one-twelfth of a carbon-12 atom (the dalton). Astronomers use the mass of the sun.

The least massive things: below 10−24 kg 

Unlike other physical quantities, mass–energy does not have an a priori expected minimal quantity, or an observed basic quantum as in the case of electric charge. Planck's law allows for the existence of photons with arbitrarily low energies. Consequently, there can only ever be an experimental upper bound on the mass of a supposedly massless particle; in the case of the photon, this confirmed upper bound is of the order of  = .

10−24 to 10−18 kg

10−18 to 10−12 kg

10−12 to 10−6 kg

10−6 to 1 kg

1 kg to 105 kg

106 to 1011 kg

1012 to 1017 kg

1018 to 1023 kg

1024 to 1029 kg

1030 to 1035 kg

1036 to 1041 kg

The most massive things: 1042 kg and greater

See also
 Lists of astronomical objects

Notes

External links 
 Mass units conversion calculator
 Mass units conversion calculator JavaScript

Mass
Mass